Enga Ooru Mappillai is a 1989 Indian Tamil-language film, directed by T. P. Gajendran and produced by Sureshkanth and M. Jagadeeshwaran. The film stars Ramarajan and Gautami. It also features Goundamani, Senthil, Santhana Bharathi and Kovai Sarala in supporting roles.

Plot
Velu moves in with his uncle Chokalingam after his mother dies, but is constantly berated by his aunt and her three con artist brothers. Naive and slightly hapless, Velu often takes the blame for the misdeeds of the three brothers. In this manner, he is pitted against Panjavarnam, daughter of Sathyamorthy, a village leader and Gandhian. Rajalingam, the richest man in town, uses his guise as a charitable village elder to rape young women and brew moonshine. 

When Sathyamoorthy offers Velu a job, he and Panjavarnam become friends. Rajalingam sets his sights on Panjavarnam, but his plots to kidnap her are foiled by a clueless Velu. Upset, Rajalingam convinces her father to agree to her marriage with another man. Due to fortunate circumstances, the true nature of the man is revealed, allowing Velu and Panjavarnam to marry. On their wedding night, Rajalingam's men attempt to kidnap Panjavarnam. They do not succeed, but Velu is chased away and beaten to near-death after he witnesses Rajalingam murdering a man. The rest of the village believes him to be dead. Velu is rescued by a military man and taught to fight. He returns to the village to reunite with Panjavarnam and challenge Rajalingam.

Cast

Ramarajan as Velu
Gautami as Panjavarnam
Goundamani
R. S. Manohar as Military man
Senthil
Kovai Sarala as Chandra
Vinu Chakravarthy as Chokalingam
Kallapetti Singaram as Sathyamoorthy
R. P. Viswam as Rajalingam
Vijaya Krishnaraj
Haaja Shereef
Kuyili

Soundtrack
Music was composed by Ilaiyaraaja and lyrics were written by Vaali, Piraisoodan and Gangai Amaran.

References

External links
 

1989 films
Films scored by Ilaiyaraaja
1980s Tamil-language films
Films directed by T. P. Gajendran